The Facta I government of Italy held office from 26 February 1922 until 1 August 1922, a total of 237 days, or 7 months and 22 days. It replaced the first cabinet of Ivanoe Bonomi which had not been given a vote of confidence by the Chamber of Deputies on 17 February.

Government parties
The government was composed by the following parties:

Composition
The cabinet members were as follows:

References

External links

Italian governments
1922 establishments in Italy
1922 disestablishments in Italy
Cabinets established in 1922
Cabinets disestablished in 1922